Stephen Joseph Flemmi (born June 9, 1934) is an American gangster and convicted murderer and was a close associate of Winter Hill Gang boss Whitey Bulger. Beginning in 1975, Flemmi was a top echelon informant for the Federal Bureau of Investigation (FBI).

Despite delivering a great deal of intelligence about the inner workings of the Patriarca crime family, Flemmi's own criminal activities proved a public relations nightmare for the FBI. He was ultimately brought up on charges under the Racketeer Influenced and Corrupt Organizations Act, and pleaded guilty in return for a sentence of life in prison.

Early years
Stephen Joseph Flemmi was the eldest of three sons (the two brothers were Michael Flemmi and Vincent Flemmi) born to Italian immigrants Giovanni Flemmi (1892–1991), and Mary Irene (née Misserville) Flemmi (1912–2000). He was raised in the Orchard Park tenement located at 25 Ambrose Street in Roxbury, Massachusetts. His father was a bricklayer and veteran of the Royal Italian Army during World War I, and his mother was a full-time homemaker.

Flemmi enlisted in the Army in 1951 at the age of 17 and served two tours of duty in Korea with the 187th Airborne Regimental Combat Team. He was awarded the Silver Star and Bronze Star Medal decorations for valor and honorably discharged in 1955.

Relationship with James J. Bulger

In 1965, James J. "Whitey" Bulger was released from Federal prison after serving a nine-year sentence for robbing banks. After a few years of working as a janitor, he became an enforcer for South Boston mob boss Donald Killeen. After Killeen was murdered by an enforcer for the Mullen Gang, Winter Hill Gang boss Howie Winter mediated the dispute between Bulger and the remaining Killeens and the Mullens, who were led by Patrick Nee. Winter soon chose Bulger as his man in South Boston. Shortly afterward, Bulger became partners with Flemmi.

At this time, the Boston FBI office tried to convince Bulger to become an informant, but he refused.

Bulger allegedly told Flemmi that he knew his secret. Flemmi has insisted that he did not know at the time that Bulger was also an informant. Kevin Weeks, however, insists that Flemmi's story is untrue. He considers it too much of a coincidence that Bulger became an informant a year after becoming Flemmi's partner. He has written of his belief that Flemmi had probably helped to build a Federal case against him. Weeks has said that Bulger was likely forced to choose between supplying information to the FBI or returning to prison.

Married life
In the 1950s, Flemmi was married to an Irish-American woman named Jeanette, from whom he later became estranged. By 1980, he planned to divorce Jeanette to marry his longtime mistress, Marilyn DeSilva, but it is unknown whether he ever followed through with the legal actions. Throughout his life, Flemmi was engaged in clandestine affairs with several other women, including sisters Debra Davis and Michelle Davis, and Deborah Hussey.
Flemmi met Debra Davis at a jewelry store, and the couple dated for more than seven years. In 1981, Bulger is said to have killed Davis because she knew that Flemmi was an informant.

Four years after killing Davis, in 1985, Flemmi and Bulger killed Deborah Hussey, who was also Flemmi's stepdaughter (born to his common-law wife, Marion A. Hussey). Deborah was first sexually molested by Flemmi in her teens—she informed her mother that Flemmi had molested her for years—and had been his girlfriend since. In the days prior to her murder, Hussey was close to breaking up with Flemmi and telling her mother about their relationship, which is thought to have been the motive for her murder.

It is thought that Flemmi, Bulger, and Weeks lured her to the house at 799 East Third Street in South Boston and garrotted her. Her body was then buried in the basement. According to Kevin Weeks,

Relationship with the FBI
Rico first recruited Flemmi as an informant in 1965.

In 1997, shortly after The Boston Globe disclosed that Bulger and Flemmi had been informants, former Bulger confidant Kevin Weeks met with John Connolly, who showed him a photocopy of Bulger's FBI informant file. In order to explain Bulger and Flemmi's status as informants, Connolly said, "The Mafia was going against Jimmy and Stevie, so Jimmy and Stevie went against them." According to Weeks,

Arrest and imprisonment
In December 1994, Connolly informed Bulger and Flemmi that several imprisoned Jewish-American bookmakers had agreed to testify to paying them protection money. As a result, sealed indictments had come from the Department of Justice and the FBI was due to make arrests during the Christmas season. In response, Bulger fled Boston on December 23, 1994, accompanied by his common law wife, Catherine Greig.

According to Kevin Weeks,  Flemmi, however, chose to remain in Boston and was swiftly taken into custody and incarcerated at the Plymouth County House of Correction.

During the discovery phase, two of Flemmi's co-defendants, Boston mafiosi Frank Salemme and Bobby DeLuca, were listening to tape from a roving bug, which is normally authorized when the FBI has no advance knowledge of where criminal activity will take place. They overheard two of the agents who were listening in on the bug mention that they should have told one of their informants to give "a list of questions" to the other wiseguys. When their lawyer, Tony Cardinale, learned about this, he realized that the FBI had lied about the basis for a roving bug in order to protect an informant. Suspecting that this was not the only occasion that this happened, Cardinale sought to force prosecutors to reveal the identities of any informants used in connection with the case.

Eventually, both Bulger and Flemmi were revealed to be FBI informants. Flemmi believed that as a result, he had protection from the FBI, but not immunity. He initially planned to prove through his own testimony and that of others that he was being prosecuted for crimes that were effectively authorized by the FBI. He believed that as a result, Judge Mark L. Wolf would have no choice but to throw out the entire indictment. Flemmi's problem was that he  couldn't really come clean. Without immunity, he couldn't admit to killings he hadn't been charged with. By the time Flemmi took the stand, in August 1998, John Martorano had pleaded guilty and started outlining the details of almost twenty murders he'd committed. Many of his murders had been done at the direction of Bulger and Flemmi, who had paid him more than $1 million during his years as a wanted fugitive between 1978 and 1995. To many questions about the murders Flemmi was involved in, he pleaded the Fifth Amendment.

However, by 2000, it was obvious this gambit had failed. Out of desperation, he ordered Weeks to get in touch with retired state police lieutenant Richard J. Schneiderhan, a lifelong friend who had been on Winter Hill's payroll for virtually his entire career, to leak information about several wiretaps investigators were monitoring in hopes of tracking down Bulger. However, when Weeks reached a plea bargain a year later, he admitted Schneiderhan's role in the leak. Schneiderhan was ultimately convicted of obstructing justice and was sentenced to 18 months in prison. In 2000, Flemmi's brother Michael, then a retired Boston Police Department officer, was arrested for moving an arsenal of more than 70 weapons from their mother's shed after learning that it was to be the target of a search warrant. He was convicted in 2002 and sentenced to 10 years in prison. A year later, he pleaded guilty to selling a load of Flemmi's stolen jewelry for $40,000.

By 2003, Flemmi realized he was out of options. Salemme and several others had joined Weeks in turning informer, and had disclosed enough information to ensure Flemmi would die in prison. He also faced possible execution for murders in Florida and Oklahoma. In October, Flemmi pleaded guilty in U.S. District Court in Boston to 10 counts of murder and accepted a sentence of life in prison without parole. He made the decision as a part of a deal to reduce the sentence for his brother, Michael Flemmi.

Flemmi testified against Connolly at the latter's trial for the murder of John Callahan, the former president of World Jai Alai. Callahan had been killed in 1981 after he was implicated in the murder of his successor as president, Roger Wheeler. According to Flemmi, Connolly told him and Bulger that Callahan could potentially turn state's evidence and implicate them in Wheeler's murder. He also testified against Bulger in the latter's 2013 trial for murder and racketeering, at which Bulger was sentenced to life plus five years.

Depictions in popular culture

In the Whitey Bulger biopic Black Mass (2015), Flemmi is portrayed by Rory Cochrane.

Murder victims

 Arthur “Bucky” Barrett
 Edward Bennett
 Walter Bennett
 William Bennett
 Richard Castucci
 Edward G. Connors
 Debra Davis
 Richard Gasso
 Stephen Hughes Jr.
 Deborah Hussey
 Tommy King
 John McIntyre
 Edward McLaughlin
 James Sousa
 Roger Wheeler

Other victims
Stephen Flemmi and Whitey Bulger are alleged to have committed statutory rape against numerous underage girls, some as young as 13, during the 1970s and 80s, deliberately getting them hooked on heroin and then sexually exploiting them for years.

See also
 Timothy A. Connolly 3rd

References

Bibliography

External links
 
 
 
 
 
 
 

 

1934 births
Living people
United States Army personnel of the Korean War
American gangsters of Italian descent
American people convicted of murder
American rapists
Federal Bureau of Investigation informants
Mafia hitmen
People convicted of racketeering
People from Boston
People from Milton, Massachusetts
Military personnel from Massachusetts
Recipients of the Silver Star
Winter Hill Gang
United States Army soldiers
Criminals from Massachusetts
People convicted of murder by the United States federal government
Prisoners sentenced to life imprisonment by the United States federal government